"Excuse Me" is a song performed by Portuguese singer Salvador Sobral. The song was released in Portugal as a digital download on 2 August 2016 as the lead single from his debut studio album Excuse Me (2016). The song peaked at number 22 on the Portuguese Singles Chart.

Music video
A music video to accompany the release of "Excuse Me" was first released on YouTube on 10 March 2016 at a length of four minutes and twenty-one seconds.

Track listing

Charts

Release history

References

2016 songs
2016 singles